Thomas S. Nolan (October 11, 1856 – December 24, 1944) was an American lawyer and politician.

Born in Janesville, Wisconsin, Nolan was educated at Ridgetown, Ontario Academy. Nolan practiced law in Janesville, Wisconsin and was a Republican. He served as president of the Janesville Police and Fire Commission. In 1919, Nolan served in the Wisconsin State Assembly. Nolan died in Janesville, Wisconsin.

Notes

1856 births
1944 deaths
Politicians from Janesville, Wisconsin
Wisconsin lawyers
Republican Party members of the Wisconsin State Assembly